The 2017 season was the 108th season in the history of Sport Club Corinthians Paulista.

Background

Kits
 Home (April 2017 onward): White shirt, black shorts and white socks;
 Away (April 2017 onward): Black shirt, white shorts and black socks;
 Third (September 2017 onward): Dark grey shirt, dark grey shorts and dark grey socks.

Previous kits
 Home (Until April 2017): White shirt, black shorts and white socks.
 Away (Until April 2017): Black shirt, white shorts and black socks.
 Third (Until September 2017): Purple/blue shirt, blue shorts and blue socks.

Squad
As of 4 September 2017

  (on loan from Bordeaux)

Managerial changes
On December 15, four days after the 2016 season ended, it was announced that Oswaldo de Oliveira was fired from the club. A week later, assistant manager Fábio Carille was announced as full-time manager for this season.

Transfers

Transfers in

Loans in

Transfers out

Loans out

Squad statistics

Overview

Pre-season and friendlies

Florida Cup

Friendlies

Last updated: 1 February 2017Source:

Campeonato Paulista

For the 2017 Campeonato Paulista, the 16 teams are divided in four groups of 4 teams (A, B, C, D). They will face all teams, except those that are in their own group, with the top two teams from each group qualifying for the quarterfinals. The two overall worst teams will be relegated.

Statistics

First stage

Knockout stages

Copa Sudamericana

Elimination stages

Final stages

Campeonato Brasileiro

Results

Copa do Brasil

Preliminary stages

See also
List of Sport Club Corinthians Paulista seasons

Notes

References

Sport Club Corinthians Paulista seasons
Corinthians